The canton of Autun-1 is an administrative division of the Saône-et-Loire department, eastern France. It was created at the French canton reorganisation which came into effect in March 2015. Its seat is in Autun.

It consists of the following communes:
 
Anost
Autun (partly)
Barnay
La Celle-en-Morvan
Chissey-en-Morvan
Collonge-la-Madeleine
Cordesse
Créot
Curgy
Cussy-en-Morvan
Dracy-Saint-Loup
Épertully
Épinac
Igornay
Lucenay-l'Évêque
Monthelon
Morlet
La Petite-Verrière
Reclesne
Roussillon-en-Morvan
Saint-Forgeot
Saint-Gervais-sur-Couches
Saint-Léger-du-Bois
Saisy
Sommant
Sully
Tavernay
Tintry

References

Cantons of Saône-et-Loire